The Integrated Biological Detection System  is a system used by the British Army for detecting Chemical, biological, radiological, and nuclear agents or elements.
The Integrated Biological Detection System can provide early warning of a chemical or biological warfare attack and is in service with the United Kingdom Joint NBC Regiment. It can be installed in a container which can be mounted on a vehicle or ground dumped. It is also able to be transported by either a fixed-wing aircraft or by helicopter.

The system comprises
 A detection suite, including equipment for atmospheric sampling
 Meteorological station and GPS
 CBRN filtration and environmental control for use in all climates
 Chemical agent detection
 A independent power supply
 Cameras for 360 degree surveillance 

A U.S. military system with a similar purpose and a similar name is the Biological Integrated Detection System (BIDS).

References

Biological warfare
British Army equipment
Chemical warfare
Toxicology in the United Kingdom